AsiaSat 9 or Thaicom 7 is a geostationary communications satellite which is operated by the Asia Satellite Telecommunications Company (AsiaSat) and was launched into orbit on 28 September 2017.

Satellite description 
Space Systems/Loral (SS/L), announced in December 2013 that it has been chosen by AsiaSat, to build the AsiaSat 9 communications satellite. AsiaSat 9 was built by Space Systems/Loral, and is based on the LS-1300 satellite bus. The satellite carries 28 C-band transponders and 32 Ku-band and is positioned at a longitude of 122° East, providing coverage over southern Asia, Australia and New Zealand.

Launch 
Krunichev by International Launch Services (ILS) was contracted to launch AsiaSat 9 using a Proton-M / Briz-M launch vehicle. The launch took place from Site 200/39 at the Baikonur, on 28 September 2017, at 18:52:16 UTC. It replaces AsiaSat 4.

See also 

 2017 in spaceflight
 List of Proton launches

References 

AsiaSat satellites
Spacecraft launched in 2017
Satellites using the SSL 1300 bus